Kolur (also Romanized as Kolūr; also known as Korūl and Kolvār) is a village in the Sabalan District of Sareyn County, Ardabil Province, Iran. At the 2006 census, its population was 112 in 21 families.

References 

Towns and villages in Sareyn County